2,2-Bis[4(2,3-hydroxypropoxy)phenyl]propane (bis-HPPP) is an organic compound that is formed when the dental composite material bis-GMA is degraded by salivary esterases. It is also called BADGE·2H2O in reference to it being the hydrolysed form of BADGE, which is used in the formation of epoxy resins. Structurally, it is a di-ether of bisphenol A.

Formation 
Together with methacrylic acid, bis-HPPP is released following the CE-catalyzed hydrolysis of 2,2-[4(2-hydroxy 3-methacryloxypropoxy)-phenyl]propane (bis-GMA). This reaction is very common in hydrolytic degradation of the dental resin since salivary esterases are able to cleave the ester bonds in acrylic polymers of dental composites.

Analysis by mass spectrometry demonstrated that hydrolytic reactions would cleave the ester bonds of both methacrylate units in bis-GMA and produce bis-HPPP along with two molecules of methacrylic acid.

References

Polyols
Phenol ethers
2,2-Bis(4-hydroxyphenyl)propanes